Probable G-protein coupled receptor 26 is a protein that in humans is encoded by the GPR26 gene. GPR26 expression is found to peak perinatally, when the visual system is first challenged, and contains a 53 kb LD-block enriched for association with introgressed Neanderthal-derived SNPs. Additionally, it is known to form oligomeric structures with the 5-HT1a receptor.

References

Further reading 

 
 
 

G protein-coupled receptors